The Roman Catholic Diocese of Iligan (Lat: Dioecesis Iliganensis) is a Roman Rite diocese of the Latin Church of the Catholic Church in the Philippines comprising 25 parishes in Iligan City and twelve municipalities located at the northern half of the Province of Lanao del Norte.

History
Erected on February 17, 1971, as a territorial prelature out of the newly elevated Diocese of Ozamiz, it was subdivided on November 20, 1976, to form the new Territorial Prelature of Marawi.

On November 15, 1982, the prelature nullius was elevated to a full diocese and is a suffragan first to the Archdiocese of Cagayan de Oro and then later to the Archdiocese of Ozamiz after its elevation on January 24, 1983.

The current bishop is Jose Rapadas III, appointed in 2019. Bishop Rapadas was a diocesan clergyman from the Diocese of Ipil in the province of Zamboanga Sibugay. He is the fifth bishop of the Diocese

Ordinaries

References

See also
Catholic Church in the Philippines

Iligan
Iligan
Iligan
Religion in Lanao del Norte